The 1886–87 season was the 16th season of competitive football (soccer) in England.

Events
 Dial Square FC are founded by workers at the Royal Arsenal, Woolwich, and play their first match on 11 December. After several name changes and moves, the club will eventually become known as Arsenal.

National team
England finished second in the 1887 British Home Championship, which was won by Scotland.

* England score given first

Key
 H = Home match
 BHC = British Home Championship

Honours

Notes = Number in parentheses is the times that club has won that honour. * indicates new record for competition

External links

Details of Ireland game
Details of Wales game
Details of Scotland game